Stepan Mykolaiovych Charnetskyi (sometimes Charnetsky, Ukrainian: Степан Миколайович Чарнецький, Polish: Stepan Czarnecki; January 21 1881, Shmankivtsi, Austria-Hungary – October 2 1944, Lviv, USSR) was a Ukrainian poet, translator, journalist, theatre and music critic, and theatre director and producer, author of the anthem of the Ukrainian Sich Riflemen "Oi u luzi chervona kalyna"

Biography
Charnetskyi was born 21 January 1881 in Shmankivtsi, Austria-Hungary (now in Chortkiv Raion, Ternopil Oblast, Ukraine). He was the thirteenth child in a priest family. His father was Greek Catholic priest Mykola Charnetskyi, who died of typhoid soon after his birth. His mother was Vladyslava Eckhardt-Charnetska.

He went to school in Stanyslaviv and then studied in Lviv's Tsisars-Royal Technical Academy (now Lviv Polytechnic National University). He then worked in Lviv as an engineer. During World War I, he was the Assistant Chief of the railway station No. 5 Lviv-Stryi, Lviv-Sambir.

He was one of the group of modernist writers in Austrian Ukraine known as the Moloda Muza (the Young Muse) that emerged in 1906, alongside Volodymyr Birchak, Mykhailo Iatskiv, Petro Karmansky, Ostap Lutsky, Vasyl Pachovsky, Osyp Turiansky and Sydir Tverdokhlib.

He was the editor of the magazines Ukrainian Voice (1915) and Ukrainian Herald. He was the artistic director of the Ruska Besida Theatre (spring 1913-August 1914) in Lviv.

He married Iryna Popovachak-Charnetska and they had two daughters, Olesia and Oleksandra.

Works
He wrote the patriotic anthem to the Ukrainian Sich Riflemen entitled "Oh, the Red Viburnum in the Meadow" (1913). Pink Floyd recorded a version of the song in 2022 as "Hey, Hey, Rise Up!".

His collections of poems included "В годині сумерку" (1908), "В годині задуми" (1917) and "Сумні ідем" (1920). He also wrote about the theatre, including the book "An Essay on the History of the Ukrainian Theater in Galicia" (1934).

In 1936, he co-wrote lyrics for the song "" with Bohdan Vesolovsky, who had previously composed the music.

He translated Adam Mickiewicz's 1828 narrative poem "Konrad Wallenrod" from the original Polish into Ukrainian. Some of Charnetsky's own poetry was translated into Polish by Tverdokhlib.

Family 
Father, Mykola Charnetskyi (January 2, 1830, place of birth unknown - June 25 1882, Shmankivtsi, Austria-Hungary) - ukrainian Greek Catholic priest, dean of the Chertkovsky deanery of the UGCC. Ordained in 1854. He served in the parishes - the Exaltation of the Holy Cross of the Lord in the city of Kopychintsy (1854-1855), the Assumption of the Blessed Virgin Mary in the village of Uhryn (1856-1868 ), the Holy Besselrebrennikov Cosmas and Damian of the village of Shmankivtsy-1882; all - Chertkovsky Raion). Played the violin well. Together with his wife Vladislava Eckhardt, they raised thirteen children, among whom the youngest was Stepan. Died 25 June 1882 of typhus, buried in the village cemetery Shmankovtsy.

Memorials 
On May 26, 1991, a monument to Stepan Charnetskyi (sculptor Ivan Muliarchuk, initiator - Nadiya Protskiv) was unveiled in the poet's family village.

In 2005, Nadiia Morykvas published the book "Melancholy of Stepan Charnetskyi". It tells about the difficult and even tragic fate of Stepan Charnetskyi. The book uses archival materials, memoirs of the poet's contemporaries, including his daughter Alexandra.

Every year the family village hosts commemorative events in honor of the poet, in particular the regional art festival "Red Viburnum".

References

External links 

 Терлюк, І. Автор пісні «Ой у лузі червона калина» Степан Чарнецький — родом з Тернопільщини // Суспільне Новини. — 2022. — 18 квітня.

Ukrainian poets
Ukrainian theatre people
1881 births
1944 deaths
People from Ternopil Oblast
Ukrainian people in the Austrian Empire
Burials at Lychakiv Cemetery